Yenimahalle Belediyesi SK is the women's handball team of the same named club sponsored by the Municipality of Yenimahalle in Ankara, Turkey. The team play in the Turkish Super League. Their colors are blue and white. Club chairman is Mesut Bolatcan. The team is managed by Serdar Eler.

Competitions

Domestic
The club transferred seven notable players, including Turkey women's national team's captain Yeliz Özel and two foreigners, for the 2013–14 season. The team finished the season as runner-up losing to Muratpaşa Bld. SK in play-off finals. The next season, they became champion.

International
Yenimahalle Bld. Sk played in the 2015–16 Women's EHF Champions League qualifying, lost in the semifinals to the Danish Team Esbjerg 28–32, ranked fourth after being defeated by the Belarusian BNTU Minsk 27–31 in the third place match. They failed to advance to the quarterfinals at the 2015–16 Women's EHF Cup Winners' Cup after losing 58–59 in two games to the Russian Zvezda Zvenigorod.

European record

Team

Current squad
Squad for the 2017-18 season

Goalkeepers
 1  Isabelle Noelle Mben Bediang
 16  Ana Rajković
 18  Yagmar Bembeyaz
Wingers
LW
 17  Behra Irem Türkoglu
 20  Ceylan Aydemir
 48  Ümmügülsüm Bedel
RW
 9  Kateryna Chumak 
 13  Bilgenur Öztürk
Line players 
 14  Nurceren Akgün Göktepe
 77  Valeriia Zoria

Backs
LB
  Anastasia Sinitsyna
 6  Sabiha Gündogdu
 7  Edanur Arslan
 10  Sandra Radović 
 35  Fatma Atalar
 RB
 07  Andrea Beleska

Legend
GK-Goalkeeper, LW-Left Winger, RW-Right Winger, LP-Line Player, BP-Back, LB-Left Back, CB-Center Back, RB-Right Back.

2018-2019 season

Players

Players In
  Anastasia Sinitsyna (LB)

Players Out
  Olga Laiuk (RB)
  Dijana Radojević (LW/CB)

Honours
Turkish Handball Super League
 Winners (2): 2014–15, 2015–16.
 Runners-up (1): 2013–14.
 Third place (1): 2020–21.

Women's EHF Champions League
 Fourth place (1): 2015–16

References

 
Turkish handball clubs
Women's handball in Turkey